The M-2 visa is a type of visa reserved for the spouse or child of an M-1 student. 

An M-2 spouse may not work or engage in full-time schooling unless it is recreational. An M-2 child may engage in full-time schooling at the primary or secondary level.

See also
 List of United States dependent visas

References

External links
 8 CFR 214.2 (m): Link to Title 8, Code of Federal Regulations.
 ICE: Becoming a nonimmigrant student in the United States
 State Department: Student visa information
 educationUSA: A guide to being a foreign student in the United States
 Visa wait times: Visa wait times at consulates around the world

United States visas by type
Student migration